James Cleugh (1891 – 7 July 1969) was an English writer and translator.

He established the Aquila Press in the 1930s to publish obscure but literary works.   He personally wrote or translated over 50 books.

Bibliography
 Love Locked Out: A Survey of Love, Licence and Restriction in the Middle Ages, Anthony Blond, Ltd., 1963
 Spain in the Modern World, 1953
 Krupps: The Story of an Industrial Empire by Gert Von Klass, and translated into English by James Cleugh. Black and white plates which include members of the Krupp family  
 Captain Thomas Johnstone, 1772-1839: Smuggler's Reach, Andrew Melrose, London, 1955
 Brighter than a Thousand Suns: A Personal History of the Atomic Scientists, Robert Jungk, translated into English by James Cleugh, Harcourt, New York, 1956
 Image of Spain, Harrap 1961
 I looked for Adam: the story of man's search for his ancestors, Herbert Wendt, translated by James Cleugh. Weidenfeld & Nicolson, 1957
 The Divine Aretino, Anthony Blond, Ltd., 1965; Stein and Day, 1966

Notes

External links
 
 Cleugh's papers at the University of Reading
Translated Penguin Book - at  Penguin First Editions reference site of early first edition Penguin Books.

English book editors
1891 births
1969 deaths
English male non-fiction writers
20th-century English historians
20th-century English male writers